Ganache ( or) is a glaze, icing, sauce, or filling for pastries, made from chocolate and cream.

Preparation 

Ganache is a chocolate preparation, normally made by heating equal parts by weight of cream and chopped chocolate, warming the cream first, then pouring it over the chocolate. The mixture is then typically left to rest for a short period (between 3 and 10 minutes generally, dependent on volume) before it is stirred or blended until smooth, with liqueurs or extracts added if desired. The resting period allows the hot cream to increase the temperature of the bowl and its contents. If one were to blend immediately this would introduce air reducing the temperature and preventing the chocolate from melting consistently. Butter is generally added to give the ganache a shiny appearance and smooth texture. Adding corn syrup also gives it a shiny color and is used to sweeten the ganache without the crystallization side effect that comes from other sugars. Depending on the kind of chocolate used, for what purpose the ganache is intended, and the temperature at which it will be served, the ratio of chocolate to cream is varied to obtain the desired consistency. Typically, two parts chocolate to one part cream are used for filling cakes or as a base for making chocolate truffles, while one to one is commonly used as a glaze. If using white chocolate, a ratio of 3 parts chocolate to 1 part cream is standard.  Heavy whipping cream is generally preferred, to make a creamier, thicker ganache.  This pairs well with dark chocolate between 60 and 82%. If the chocolate should seize while being mixed with the warm cream, adding tablespoon by tablespoon of hot water to the mixture can remedy the problem.

Cooled ganache can be whipped to increase volume and spread as icing to cover a cake.  It becomes thicker as it cools.  Ganache is also poured into a mold or terrine while warm, and allowed to set or cool.  Once cool, it can be removed from the mold and sliced similarly to pâté.

History 
It is said that ganache was originally invented in the 1850s in France during an accident in which water was poured over chocolate.    Ganache or crème ganache was originally a kind of chocolate truffle introduced by the Paris playwright-turned-confectioner Paul Siraudin, and first documented in 1869. Siraudin named the sweet after a popular Vaudeville comedy debuted in that year by his contemporary Victorien Sardou called Les Ganaches ("The Chumps").

Gallery

See also 

 Enrobing — a chocolate coating process
 Chocolate tempering

References

External links
 

Chocolate
Food ingredients
French cuisine
Articles containing video clips